Spatsizi Plateau Wilderness Provincial Park is a provincial park in British Columbia, Canada, protecting most of the Spatsizi Plateau, the southeasternmost subplateau of the Stikine Plateau, and the upper reaches of the basin of the Stikine River.

Etymology
"Spatsizi" is an anglicization of a phrase from the Sekani language meaning "red goat" (tspah=goat, tsije=red). Mountain goats in the region roll on a particular red-coloured mountain, with the ochre dust colouring their coats red.

History
Originally established by an Order in Council (OIC) at approximately 1,668,000 acres (675,016 ha) more or less, it was converted by the Protected Areas of British Columbia Amendment Act, 2001, legislation by the then-new Liberal government to  696,091 ha (1,720,078 acres) more or less, and was again reduced by the Parks and Protected Areas Statutes Amendment Act, 2003, to 695,102 ha (1,717,634 acres) more or less.

Geography
The park borders Stikine River Provincial Park to the north, Tatlatui Provincial Park to the southeast, and completely surrounds Gladys Lake Ecological Reserve.

Ecology
This is the range of the province's largest remaining herd of woodland caribou, as well as mountain goats, moose, grizzlies and wolves.

See also
Spatsizi Headwaters Provincial Park

References

External links
BC Parks webpage

Provincial parks of British Columbia
Stikine Country
Stikine Plateau
Protected areas established in 1975
1975 establishments in British Columbia